This is a list of episodes for the 1980s television series Small Wonder.

Series overview
Shout! Factory has released the first two seasons of Small Wonder on DVD in Region 1.  Season 2 was released as a Shout! Factory select title, available exclusively through their online store.

Episodes

Season 1 (1985–86)

Season 2 (1986–87)

Season 3 (1987–88)

Season 4 (1988–89)

References

External links
 
 

Small Wonder

fr:Petite Merveille#Épisodes